Cletocamptoides helobius is a species of copepod that lives in the waters of North America. It was first described by John W. Fleeger in 1980. The species has been used in a study of the evolution of the DNA of the related species Cletocamptus deitersi.

References

Harpacticoida
Freshwater crustaceans of North America
Crustaceans described in 1980